The 1902–03 season was Blackpool F.C.'s sixth season (third consecutive) in the Football League. They competed in the eighteen-team Division Two, then the second tier of English football, finishing fourteenth.

Walter Cookson and Geordie Anderson were the club's joint-top scorers, with eight goals apiece.

Harry Stirzaker retired at the end of the season, after nine years of service for Blackpool, his only professional club.

Season review
Blackpool opened the season with a trip to Burslem Port Vale on 6 September. Fred Heywood, on his debut for the club, netted Blackpool's goal in a 1–1 draw. Two other Blackpool players were given debuts: Teddy Duckworth and, from Bristol City, Walter Cookson.

Seven days later, the Seasiders hosted Barnsley at Bloomfield Road. Geordie Anderson scored a hat-trick in a 3–3 draw.

Three more draws followed: 0–0 at Gainsborough Trinity, 3–3 at home to Burton United (Anderson, Jack Parkinson and Duckworth getting the hosts' goals) and 2–2 at home to Glossop North End (Parkinson and Cookson).

Blackpool obtained their first win in their six-game unbeaten start to the campaign against Stockport County on 25 October. Jack Birchall (his only goal of the season) and a Stockport own-goal were the decisive strikes.

On 8 November, Blackpool travelled to Woolwich Arsenal and suffered their first defeat of the season, 2–1, with Edward Threlfall getting the visitors' goal.

After a two-week break, Lincoln City hosted Blackpool. Parkinson and Anderson scored in a 2–0 win for the Lancastrians.

A week later, Small Heath visited Bloomfield Road and won by a single goal.

Into December, Blackpool travelled to Leicester Fosse on the 6th. Cookson scored, but the visitors lost 2–1.

Manchester City made it three straight defeats for the Seasiders on 13 December, winning 3–0 at Bloomfield Road.

Blackpool made the short trip to East Lancashire the following week to take on Burnley. Cookson scored his third of the season as the honours were shared in a 1–1 draw.

On Christmas Day, Blackpool put four without reply past Doncaster Rovers at Bloomfield Road. Harold Hardman (two), Parkinson and William Anderton scored the goals.

The next day, Blackpool travelled to Manchester United for a first meeting with their north-west neighbours since they changed their name from Newton Heath. Heywood scored two goals as Blackpool held on for a 2–2 draw.

The same scoreline followed in Blackpool's third game in as many days, at home to Preston North End in the first West Lancashire derby of the season, Heywood and Cookson the scorers for 'Pool.

Blackpool suffered a New Year's Day single-goal defeat at home to Bristol City to kick off 1903. It was the first of three consecutive reversals, the other two being at home against Burslem Port Vale (2–5; Anderson and Cookson the scorers) and away to Barnsley (0–6).

The ship was steadied briefly with a 4–0 victory over Gainsborough Trinity at Bloomfield Road on 17 January (two goals from Anderson and one each from Hardman and Anderton), but another defeat followed — 0–2 at Burton United.

A run of three consecutive wins in late January and early February boosted Blackpool's league position. Firstly, on 31 January, they defeated Bristol City on the road with a single Cookson goal. This was followed by a 2–0 result at home to Burnley, a  Jack Scott penalty and Hardman's fourth strike of the season doing the damage. Finally, Manchester United visited Bloomfield Road on 14 February, and were dealt a 2–0 defeat, Cookson and Threlfall getting the goals.

Away defeats against Glossop North End and Stockport County (0–1 and 0–4, respectively) followed, however, then two draws (1–1 at Chesterfield — Anderton getting Blackpool's goal — and 0–0 at home to Woolwich Arsenal).

Three consecutive defeats made it seven games without a win for the Seasiders. On 14 March they lost 3–0 at Doncaster Rovers. A week later, at home to Lincoln City, they were overturned 3–2 (Hardman and Parkinson netting their goals), and on 28 March they suffered a 5–1 defeat, with Hardman making the scoresheet. Blackpool's goalkeeper, Arthur Hull, played in midfield.

On 4 April, Blackpool returned to winning ways with a 2–0 result at home to Leicester Fosse. Duckworth scored both goals.

Six days later, Blackpool faced arch-rivals Preston North End at Deepdale and returned pointless after a 3–1 defeat. Scott scored the visitors' goal from the penalty spot.

The next day saw another defeat, this time 2–0 at champions-elect Manchester City.

The season was rounded off with a 2–1 victory over Chesterfield at Bloomfield Road.

Table

Player statistics

Appearances
Fred Heywood – 33
Jack Parkinson – 31
 Jack Scott – 32
Bob Birkett – 30
Harold Hardman – 30
William Anderton – 28
Tom Wolstenholme – 28
Edward Threlfall – 26
Jack Birchall – 22
Geordie Anderson – 21
Arthur Hull – 16 (including one in midfield)
Joe Dorrington – 12
Lorenzo Evans – 11
Teddy Duckworth – 10
Harry Stirzaker – 9
Walter Cookson – 8
J.W. Wright – 7
Henry Parr – 3

Players used: 18

Goals
Geordie Anderson – 8
Walter Cookson – 8
Harold Hardman – 6
Jack Parkinson – 6
Fred Heywood – 4
William Anderton – 3
Teddy Duckworth – 3
 Jack Scott – 2
Edward Threlfall – 2
Jack Birchall – 1

Goals scored: 43 (plus one own-goal)

Transfers

In

Out
The following players left after the final game of the previous season:

Notes

References

Blackpool F.C.
Blackpool F.C. seasons